The Division of Burke has twice been used as the name of an Australian Electoral Division in Victoria. Both were in the northern suburbs of Melbourne, but did not overlap:

 Division of Burke (1949–1955), in the inner suburbs of Melbourne
 Division of Burke (1969–2004), in the outer suburbs of Melbourne

See also
 Division of Bourke, a former Australian electoral division in Victoria (1900-1949)